Wendigo is a 2001 American independent psychological horror film written and directed by Larry Fessenden, starring Patricia Clarkson and Jake Weber. The film concerns a photographer, George, and his family who experience the presence of a dark force in a cabin during their wintry weekend at upstate New York while being stalked by a local hunter after accidentally hitting a deer on the road. Meanwhile, George's son, Miles, begins to have vivid hallucinations of the legendary Wendigo, who he believes to be responsible for the dark forces. 

The film was produced by Antidote Films and Glass Eye Pix, and was distributed by Magnolia Pictures. It was released to theatres on January 23, 2001, for a limited time, and received mixed reviews by critics. The film was not a major box office attraction and bombed as it scored $1,107 on opening weekend.

Plot
George (Jake Weber) is a highly-strung professional photographer who is starting to unravel from the stress of his work with a Manhattan advertising agency. Needing some time away from the city, his wife Kim (Patricia Clarkson), and their 10-year-old son Miles (Erik Per Sullivan) head to Upstate New York to take in the winter sights, though the drive up is hardly relaxing for any of them.

George accidentally hits and severely injures a deer that ran onto the icy road. When George stops to inspect the damage, he gets confronted by an angry local named Otis who flies into a rage, telling George that he and his fellow hunters had been tracking the deer for some time. An argument breaks out, which leaves George feeling deeply shaken. When George and Kim arrive at their cabin, they discover that a dark and intimidating presence seems to have taken it over.

The next day, when they stop at a store in a town near the cabin, a shopkeeper tells Miles about the legend of the Wendigo, a deformed beast from Native American folklore who changes from a human to a hideous beast after engaging in cannibalism. The shopkeeper also tells him that the Wendigo also has supernatural powers and the ability to change its appearance at will. The shopkeeper then gives him a small figurine of a Wendigo. Miles can't help but think the Wendigo has something to do with the dark forces at work in the woods near the cabin.

Later that day, while sledding together, George suddenly falls to the ground, leaving Miles alone and lost in the woods. Frightened, Miles approaches his dad when he is chased by the Wendigo and passes out. He is awakened later by a frightened Kim, who went looking for her family once they didn't come home.

Kim and Miles begin a trek deep into the forest, until they end up at the house, where they find a bloody George crawling towards the car claiming Otis shot him. Frantic, Kim and Miles put George in the car and drive to the nearest hospital. It is revealed that George and Miles were sledding near a shooting range and Otis shot George in the liver with a hunting rifle. George undergoes emergency surgery and Miles walks into the hospital, hallucinates that his father is being assaulted by the Wendigo and faints. He awakens only to find that George has died.

Otis is confronted by the local sheriff, but he kills the sheriff and drives away into the night, being stalked by the Wendigo until he crashes into a tree and runs away into the forest, eventually ending up on a road where he is hit by the deputy sheriff's squad car. The movie ends with Otis being carted into the emergency room of the hospital, and being followed by the Indian shopkeeper while Miles watches it all, caressing the Wendigo figurine.

Cast
Patricia Clarkson as Kim 
Jake Weber as George 
Erik Per Sullivan as Miles 
John Speredakos as Otis 
Christopher Wynkoop as Sheriff Tom Hale 
Lloyd Oxendine as Elder 
Brian Delate as Everett 
Daniel Stewart Sherman as Billy 
Jennifer Wiltsie as Martha 
Maxx Stratton as Brandon 
Richard Stratton as Earl 
Dash Stratton as Little Otis 
Dwayne Navara as Mechanic 
Shelly Bolding as Store Owner 
Susan Pellegrino as Nurse 
James Godwin as Wendigo

Release

Box office
The film opened in limited release, was not a major box office attraction, and only scored $1,107 at opening weekend.

Home media
The film was released on DVD by Live/Artisan on December 17, 2002. It was re-released by Cinema Club on June 16, 2003.

Reception

Wendigo was met with mixed reviews by critics. The site's critical consensus reads, "An artsy horror flick, Wendigo effectively creates an eerie atmosphere". Metacritic, which assigns a weighted average rating to reviews, the film has a weighted average score of 63 out of 100, based on 19 critics, indicating "Generally favorable reviews".

Roger Ebert gave the film two and a half out of four stars. In his review, Ebert wrote, "Wendigo is a good movie with an ending that doesn't work. While it was not working I felt a keen disappointment, because the rest of the movie works so well". Dave Kehr of The New York Times gave the film a positive review stating, "As in his previous films, Mr. Fessenden carefully blurs the line between psychology and the supernatural, suggesting that each is strongly implicated in the other. The rampaging Wendigo may be a manifestation of Miles's incipient Oedipal rage, but at the same time it is a force embedded in nature and history. Such abstract notions may put off fans of the genre in its most elemental, slice-and-dice form. But for those in search of something different, Wendigo is a genuinely bone-chilling tale". Felix Vasquez, Jr. from Cinema Crazed.com gave the film a positive review, praising the film's ending and suspense. AllMovie called the film "effectively creepy" and "surprisingly unsettling", "despite its inherent cheesiness".

Scott Foundas of Variety suggested that "[the film], which should rivet audiences attracted to the more philosophical elements of The Blair Witch Project and The Sixth Sense could build strong word-of-mouth if not misrepresented as a conventional monster movie".

See also
Until Dawn 
Ghostkeeper

References

External links

2001 horror films
2000s monster movies
American supernatural horror films
American monster movies
American psychological horror films
Films about cryptids
Films set in New York (state)
Glass Eye Pix films
Magnolia Pictures films
2000s psychological horror films
Wendigos in popular culture
Films based on Native American mythology
2000s English-language films
2000s American films